A religious habit is a distinctive set of religious clothing worn by members of a religious order. Traditionally some plain garb recognizable as a religious habit has also been worn by those leading the religious eremitic and anchoritic life, although in their case without conformity to a particular uniform style.

Uniformity and distinctiveness by order often evolved and changed over time. Interpretation of terms for clothes in religious rules could change over centuries. Furthermore, every time new communities gained importance in a cultural area the need for visual separation increased for new as well as old communities. Thus, modern habits are rooted in historic forms, but do not necessarily resemble them in cut, colour, material, detail or use.

In Christian monastic orders of the Catholic, Lutheran and Anglican Churches, the habit often consists of a tunic covered by a scapular and cowl, with a hood for monks or friars and a veil for nuns; in apostolic orders it may be a distinctive form of cassock for men, or a distinctive habit and veil for women. Catholic Canon Law requires only that the garb of their members be in some way identifiable so that the person may serve as a witness of the Evangelical counsels.

In many orders, the conclusion of postulancy and the beginning of the novitiate is marked by a ceremony, in which the new novice is accepted as a novice and then clothed in the community's habit by the superior. In some cases the novice's habit will be somewhat different from the customary habit: for instance, in certain orders of women that use the veil, it is common for novices to wear a white veil while professed members wear black, or if the order generally wears white, the novice wears a grey veil. Among some Franciscan communities of men, novices wear a sort of overshirt over their tunic; Carthusian novices wear a black cloak over their white habit.

Buddhism

Kāṣāya (Sanskrit: काषाय kāṣāya; Pali: kasāva), "chougu" (Tibetan) are the robes of Buddhist monks and nuns, named after a brown or saffron dye. In Sanskrit and Pali, these robes are also given the more general term cīvara, which references the robes without regard to color.

Origin and construction

Buddhist kāṣāya are said to have originated in India as set of robes for the devotees of Gautama Buddha. A notable variant has a pattern reminiscent of an Asian rice field. Original kāṣāya were constructed of discarded fabric. These were stitched together to form three rectangular pieces of cloth, which were then fitted over the body in a specific manner. Together they form the "triple robe," or tricīvara. The tricīvara is described more fully in the Theravāda Vinaya (Vin 1:94 289).

Uttarāsaṅga
A robe covering the upper body. It is worn over the undergarment, or antarvāsa. In representations of the Buddha, the uttarāsaṅga rarely appears as the uppermost garment, since it is often covered by the outer robe, or saṃghāti.

Saṃghāti
The saṃghāti is an outer robe used for various occasions. It comes over the upper robe, and the undergarment (antarvāsa). In representations of the Buddha, the saṃghāti is usually the most visible garment, with the undergarment or uttarāsaṅga protruding at the bottom. It is quite similar in shape to the Greek himation, and its shape and folds have been treated in Greek style in the Greco-Buddhist art of Gandhāra.

Additions
Other items that may have been worn with the triple robe were:
 a waist cloth, the kushalaka
 a buckled belt, the samakaksika

Kāṣāya in Indian Buddhism

In India, variations of the kāṣāya robe distinguished different types of monastics. These represented the different schools that they belonged to, and their robes ranged widely from red and ochre, to blue and black.

Between 148 and 170 CE, the Parthian monk An Shigao came to China and translated a work which describes the color of monastic robes utilized in five major Indian Buddhist sects, called Dà Bǐqiū Sānqiān Wēiyí (Ch. 大比丘三千威儀). Another text translated at a later date, the Śariputraparipṛcchā, contains a very similar passage corroborating this information, but the colors for the Sarvāstivāda and Dharmaguptaka sects are reversed.

In traditions of Tibetan Buddhism, which follow the Mūlasarvāstivāda Vinaya, red robes are regarded as characteristic of the Mūlasarvāstivādins.

According to Dudjom Rinpoche from the tradition of Tibetan Buddhism, the robes of fully ordained Mahāsāṃghika monastics were to be sewn out of more than seven sections, but no more than twenty-three sections. The symbols sewn on the robes were the endless knot (Skt. śrīvatsa) and the conch shell (Skt. śaṅkha), two of the Eight Auspicious Signs in Buddhism.

Jiāshā in Chinese Buddhism
In Chinese Buddhism, the kāṣāya is called gāsā (Ch. 袈裟). During the early period of Chinese Buddhism, the most common color was red. Later, the color of the robes came to serve as a way to distinguish monastics, just as they did in India. However, the colors of a Chinese Buddhist monastic's robes often corresponded to their geographical region rather than to any specific schools. By the maturation of Chinese Buddhism, only the Dharmaguptaka ordination lineage was still in use, and therefore the color of robes served no useful purpose as a designation for sects, the way that it had in India.

in Japanese Buddhism

In Japan, during the Edo and Meiji periods,  were sometimes pieced together from the theatrical kimono used in Noh theatre.

Christianity

Roman Catholicism
Pope John Paul II in his post-apostolic Exhortation Vita consecrata (1996) says concerning the religious habit of consecrated persons:

§25 … The Church must always seek to make her presence visible in everyday life, especially in contemporary culture, which is often very secularized and yet sensitive to the language of signs. In this regard the Church has a right to expect a significant contribution from consecrated persons, called as they are in every situation to bear clear witness that they belong to Christ.
Since the habit is a sign of consecration, poverty and membership in a particular Religious family, I join the Fathers of the Synod in strongly recommending to men and women religious that they wear their proper habit, suitably adapted to the conditions of time and place.
Where valid reasons of their apostolate call for it, Religious, in conformity with the norms of their Institute, may also dress in a simple and modest manner, with an appropriate symbol, in such a way that their consecration is recognizable.
Institutes which from their origin or by provision of their Constitutions do not have a specific habit should ensure that the dress of their members corresponds in dignity and simplicity to the nature of their vocation.

Nuns

The religious habits of Roman Catholic nuns typically consist of the following elements:

 Tunic: This is the central piece of the habit. It is a loose dress made of serge fabric pleated at the neck and draping to the ground.  It can be worn pinned up in the front or in the back to allow the nun to work.
 Scapular: This symbolic apron hangs from both front and back; it is worn over the tunic, and Benedictine nuns also wear it over the belt, whereas some other orders wear it tied under the belt.
 Cincture: The habit is often secured around the waist with a belt of leather, wool or a lanyard. The cincture of the Franciscan orders has three (or four) knots standing for the vows.
 Coif: This is the garment's headpiece and includes the white cotton cap secured by a bandeau and a white wimple (to cover the neck and cheeks) and guimpe (to cover the chest, similar to a short cape) of starched linen, cotton, or (today) polyester. It is sometimes covered by a thin layer of black crêpe.
 Veil: This element is worn pinned over the coif head coverings. Some veils can be worn down to cover the face or up to expose it. The veil sometimes includes a white underveil as well. The colour of the veil depends as well from the habit of the order and the status of the sister or nun (novices or postulants wear differently coloured veils than the professed sisters and nuns).

The coif and veil were common items of clothing for married women in medieval Europe.

Different orders adhere to different styles of dress; these styles have changed over time.

Sisters

The religious habit of Roman Catholic sisters sometimes consists of a plain dress and a veil. Different orders adhere to different styles of dress; these styles have changed over time. For example, in former times, the Daughters of Charity of Saint Vincent de Paul wore a cornette instead of a veil. Some congregations decided in the course of changes due the ecclesiastical document Perfectae caritatis to simplify their habits, to conform to the attire of the culture they are working in, or to even drop their use at all.

The Carmelite Sisters of the Most Sacred Heart wear a habit including cincture, rosary, scapular, and veil. The Dominican Sisters of Mary Immaculate Province wear a habit consisting of tunic, belt, rosary, scapular, veil, and cappa or mantle.

Monks

Monks in the Roman Catholic church wear a tunic, a cincture, a hooded scapular, and, for the Liturgy of the Hours, a mantle (novices) or a cowl (professed monks).

Friars

Canons regular

Owing to the different traditions and origins that exist, there is no singular common habit worn by the Canons Regular. Historically the common habit was the distinctive white cassock, with white fascia, over time some communities of Canons have changed to wearing the black cassock with black fascia. The only item of the habit that is common to all Canons is the linen rochet a mark of the canonical status. Some communities of canons, notably in Austria and Switzerland wear a sarotium, coming from the Latin sacrum rochettum, "the sacred rochet". It is a thin band of linen worn over the cassock when not in choir. As part of their choir dress, some communities of Canons wear a mozzetta, either black or purple over the rochet. Outdoors Canons wear a black cloak and hood, but again adaptations have been made to this in some of the communities. Canons also traditionally wore a biretta.

Clergy

Usually, secular priests wear either a black cassock or an ordinary men's garb in black or another dark color along with a white clerical collar. White cassocks or clothes may be worn in hot climates. Also, a ferraiolo (a kind of cope) could be worn along with the cassock. Priests also traditionally wore a biretta along with the cassock.

Deacons, priests, and bishops belonging to religious institutes wear the habit of that institute.

Abbot or cardinal

Latin Rite clergy other than bishops, in particular any who are abbots or apostolic prefects or ordinary of a personal ordinariate, may wear pontifical items. Mitre, crosier and ring are bestowed on an abbot at his blessing and the pectoral cross is a customary part of an abbatial habit.

Gallery

Lutheranism
In Lutheranism, various religious orders have a habit of a different colour. The Daughters of Mary wear a blue habit.

Anglicanism

Eastern Orthodoxy

The Eastern Orthodox Church does not have distinct religious orders such as those in the Catholic Church. The habit (Greek: Σχήμα, Schēma) is essentially the same throughout the world. The normal monastic color is black, symbolic of repentance and simplicity. The habits of monks and nuns are identical; additionally, nuns wear a scarf, called an apostolnik. The habit is bestowed in degrees, as the monk or nun advances in the spiritual life. There are three degrees: (1) the beginner, known as the Rassaphore ("robe bearer") (2) the intermediate, known as the Stavrophore ("cross bearer"), and (3) the Great Schema worn by Great Schema Monks or Nuns. Only the last, the Schemamonk or Schemanun, the monastic of the highest degree, wears the full habit.

The habit is formally bestowed upon monks and nuns at the ceremony known as the tonsure (Gr. κουρά). The parts of the Eastern Orthodox habit are:

 Inner Rason (Greek: Έσώρασον, Ζωστικὸν or Ἀντερί, Esórason; Slavonic: Podryásnik): The inner rason (cassock) is the innermost garment. It is a long, collared garment coming to the feet, with narrow, tapered sleeves. Unlike the Roman cassock, it is double-breasted. The inner rason is the basic garment and is worn at all times, even when working. It is often given to novices and seminarians, though this differs from community to community. The inner rason is also worn by chanters, readers, and the married clergy. For monks and nuns, it symbolizes the vow of poverty.
 Belt (Greek: Ζώνη, Zone; Slavonic: Poyas): The belt worn by Orthodox monks and nuns is normally leather, though sometimes it is of cloth. In the Russian tradition, married clergy, as well as the higher monastic clergy, may wear a cloth belt that is finely embroidered, especially on feast days. The belt is symbolic of the vow of chastity.
 Paramand (Greek: Παραμανδύας, Paramandýas; Slavonic: Paraman): The Paramand is a piece of cloth, approximately 5 inches square which is attached by ribbons to a wooden cross. The cloth is embroidered with a cross and the Instruments of the Passion. The wooden cross is worn over the chest, then the ribbons pass over and under the arms, like a yoke, and hold the square cloth centered on the back. The paramand is symbolic of the yoke of Christ.
 Outer Rason (a.k.a. riasa, Greek: εξώρασον, exorason or simply ράσο, raso; Slavonic: ryasa): Among the Greeks it is worn by readers and all higher clerics; among the Russians it is worn only by monks, deacons, priests, and bishops.
 Analavos (Greek: Άνάλαβος; Slavonic: Analav): The distinctive dress of the Great Schema is the analavos, and it is worn only by Schemamonks and Schemanuns. Traditionally made of either leather or wool, the analavos covers the shoulders, and then comes down in the front and back, forming a cross (see illustration, above right).
 Polystavrion (Greek: Πολυσταύριον, lit. "many crosses"): The polystavrion is a long cord that has been plaited with numerous crosses forming a yoke that is worn over the analavos to hold it in place.
 Mantle (Greek: Μανδύας, Mandías; Slavonic: Mantíya): The Mantle is a long, full cape, joined at the neck which the monastic wears over the other parts of the habit.

 Kalymafki (a.k.a. Kalimavkion, Greek: καλυμαύκι; Slavonic: klobuk): The distinctive headdress of Eastern Orthodox monks and nuns is the kalymafki, a stiffened hat, something like a fez, only black and with straight sides, covered with a veil. The veil has lappets which hang down on each side of the head and a stylized hood falling down the back. For monastics of the Great Schema, the kalymafki takes a very distinctive shape, known as a koukoulion (cowl), and is embroidered with the Instruments of the Passion. The koukoulion is also worn by the Patriarchs of several local churches, regardless of whether or not he has been tonsured to that degree. In the Slavic tradition, the koukoulion will be in the form of a cloth hood, similar to that worn on the Western cowl. Outside church, monastics wear a soft hat known as a Skufia. Again, for Schemamonks and Schemanuns it is embroidered with the Instruments of the Passion.

The portions of the habit worn by the various degrees of monastics is as follows:

Gallery

Hinduism

Islam

Jainism
Female ascetics and Svetambara male monks always wear un-stitched or minimally stitched white clothes. Digambara Jain monks do not wear clothes. A loin cloth which reaches up to the shins is called a Cholapattak. Another cloth to cover the upper part of the body is called Pangarani (Uttariya Vastra). A cloth that passes over the left shoulder and covers the body up to a little above the ankle is called a Kïmli. Kïmli is a woolen shawl. They also carry a woolen bed sheet and a woolen mat to sit on. Those who wear clothes have a muhapati, which is a square or rectangular piece of cloth of a prescribed measurement, either in their hand or tied on their face covering the mouth. Svetambara ascetics have an Ogho or Rajoharan (a broom of woolen threads) to clean insects around their sitting place or while they are walking. Digambara ascetics have a Morpichhi and a Kamandal in their hands. This practice may vary among different sects of Jains but essential principle remains the same to limit needs.

Judaism

Shinto
In Japan, various types of very traditional dress are worn by Shinto priests, often dating to styles worn by nobles during the Nara period or Heian period.

 - a type of traditional Japanese clothing, originally worn only by men, but today they are worn by both sexes. There are two types, divided  and undivided . The umanori type have divided legs, similar to trousers, but both types appear similar.
 is a garment worn in Japan by people attending religious ceremonies and activities, including Buddhist and Shinto related occasions. Not only Shinto and Buddhist priests can be found wearing Jōe at rituals, but laymen as well, for example when participating in pilgrimage such as the Shikoku Pilgrimage. The garment is usually white or yellow and is made of linen or silk depending on its kind and use. The Shinto priest who wears the jōe is attired in a peaked cap called tate-eboshi, an outer tunic called the jōe proper, an outer robe called jōe no sodegukuri no o, an undergarment called hitoe, ballooning trousers called sashinuki or nubakama, and a girdle called jōe no ate-obi.

See also
Degrees of Eastern Orthodox monasticism
Tonsure
Religious dress
Zucchetto

Footnotes

Further reading

External links 

New Catholic Dictionary
Images of medieval monks and nuns in the dress of their Orders. (Public Domain images and text.)
Many photographs of nuns and sisters in the dress of their respective orders.
Catholic Sisters International Collection, University of Dayton Special Collections (Photographs of reproductions of over 130 religious habits)

Monasticism
Sacramentals
Christian clothing
Robes and cloaks
Religious clothing
Eastern Christian vestments
History of clothing
History of clothing (Western fashion)
History of fashion
Byzantine clothing
Religious practices
Asceticism
Hesychasm